Extended Play Remixes can refer to the following Christian music remix EPs:

 Don't Censor Me: Extended Play Remixes by Audio Adrenaline
 Code of Ethics: Extended Play Remixes by Code of Ethics
 Free at Last: Extended Play Remixes by dc Talk
 Evolution: Extended Play Remixes by Geoff Moore and the Distance
 Rebecca St. James: Extended Play Remixes by Rebecca St. James

ForeFront Records remix albums